"Forever Blue" is the 79th episode of Cold Case and the tenth episode of the fourth season. The episode aired on December 3, 2006 on CBS. The team re-investigates the 1968 death of a policeman who was shot in his patrol car. The case was then ruled as a drug bust gone bad, but new evidence reveals that there is more than meets the eye.

Plot

It is the 1960s. The episode begins in a church. Jimmy and Eileen Bruno's third child, a son, is to be baptized, but Jimmy's partner in the police force, Sean 'Coop' Cooper, is late. He arrives and apologizes to Eileen, but Eileen is cold. The two appear to be on some strange terms, an anticipation of what would be discovered as investigations of the episode's case go on. In the next scene, Sean Cooper is dead in his patrol car.

Back to the present, a convict hoping to benefit from his tip tells Det. Lilly Rush and Lt. John Stillman what he saw as the first person on the scene. He claims that Coop is 'dirty' and was associated with Teddy Burke, a drug dealer in his heyday during the 1960s. It is a lead that would ruin the reputation of Coop.

Sean Cooper's father, Brogan Cooper, arrives in the Cold Case department and speaks with John, whom he knows from the force, to defend Coop's name. Meanwhile, Kat Miller and Will Jeffries pay a visit to an old colleague of Coop, Owen Murphy. From him, they learn that Coop could never have been in cahoots with Teddy Burkes - he was too righteous and had very obvious conflicts with Burke.

The next person the team speaks to is Jimmy Bruno, Coop's partner before his murder. From him, a new lead arises. The one who was really corrupted was their superior, Lt. Tom McCree. Jimmy also reveals that it is Tom McCree who handles the dispatches in the precinct. With the ability to set Coop up and a reason to do so, Tom becomes a prime suspect.

Lt. John Stillman and Det. Will Jeffries team up and find Tom McCree who admits to accepting bribes from Burke on grounds that it was more sensible to just 'tax' the drug dealer to take care of his men. He, however, denies dispatching Coop on the day he was murdered with reasonable confidence, claiming that it was probably Coop's womanizing that got him killed, citing Coop's affair with Eileen Bruno (Jimmy's wife) as an example. In a flashback, Coop and Eileen are seen arguing over an affair, but Coop's reactions to Tom's stern words once again reveals that something is not as it seems. Lily Rush and Scotty Valens immediately pays a visit to Eileen Bruno. In the church from the opening scene, Eileen reveals the case's main twist. As she tells Lily and Scott, "My heart got broke yes, but not how you think."

Eileen's flashback is centered around her husband and his partner, Jimmy and Coop. In it, a pregnant Eileen takes a loving peek at the two men drinking and arguing over the nature of their job late in the night. Coop is giving Jimmy a dressing down for accepting fifty 'dirty' bucks a week. Jimmy, obviously drunk and frustrated, tells Coop that he is being too righteous and claimed that his righteousness was merely an act ("because it's another good time for you"). Coop defends his position and tells Jimmy "I bust shins because I'm enforcing the law.", a statement to which Eileen smiles to from behind the curtains where the men do not see her. Coop adds that what they do "ain't fun and games", but it gets ugly in an instant when Jimmy crosses the line by saying "Sure it is. Just like the fun you had slaughtering Vietcong. You miss that free pass to kill don't you." Coop retaliates with a punch and then gets into a brawl with Jimmy. The twist comes when Coop suddenly grabs Jimmy by the head and gives him a deep and frustrated kiss. Jimmy pushes him away at first, but after a few moments, embraces Coop, sharing with him a deeper and more passionate kiss. Eileen sees the entire exchange and holds her stomach in shock and sadness. When the present returns, Lily and Scotty are visibly shaken, realizing that Coop was likely killed in a hate crime and worse by a cop. 

At that point, the team speaks to Jimmy in their department and they tell him they know what was between him and Coop. Jimmy uncomfortably denies it, and tells them that Eileen is probably still bitter over the divorce and they got it wrong. However, when Lt. John suggests that maybe someone else also got it wrong and did something to Coop, Jimmy tells the team that Owen Murphy may have had a hand in Coop's death, recounting an incident in the police locker room where Coop more or less outed himself in front of everyone there in a fit of rage when Murphy made homophobic remarks and compared Jimmy and Coop, "The Dynamic Duo", to the "homo" Batman and Robin. When Lily and Will sternly interrogates Murphy later, he claims that killing another member of the force was something he would never do. Instead, he tells them that he told 'Sarge', Coop's father Brogan, and that he expected him to "sort (Coop) out". Further investigation by Kat also uncovers dispatch records on the night of Coop's death. The person who sent Coop to his death was none other than his own father, much to the dismay of Lt. John Stillman, who takes the evidence from Kat.

Scotty and Vera then approach Brogan Cooper and tell him they know about relationship between the two cops, but Brogan deludes himself and insists that Coop was a "Lady's Man", as well as lying about the dispatch. Vera promptly reveals the dispatch slip and Brogan's false smile disappears. He proceeds to grimly admit what happened setting Coop up with help from Tom McCree to try put some sense into his son. As Scotty and Vera leave, a broken Brogan tells the two men who have turned their backs to him that he no longer cared who Coop was, and that he just wanted him back.

Knowing that Tom McCree was obviously lying the first time he was approached, Lt. John Stillman personally interrogates the retired lieutenant. John cuts to the chase and calls Tom's command "a mess", concluding that the police he sent to scare Coop ended up shooting him. The proud commander insists that he had no undisciplined cops but John pushes the point. Annoyed, Tom is unable to hide his anger towards Coop ("There's no word for what he is!") and admits that he "clean(ed) house". When John finally asks "So what did you do?", Tom McCree indignantly replies "I shot that queer and I'd do it again!". In another room, Jimmy tells Lily that the only reason he wasn't with Coop that night was because he was afraid the world would know who he was. With that, the case is solved and both Brogan Cooper and Tom McCree are put to justice.

The concluding flashback shows Jimmy telling Coop "I ain't a queer", Tom ambushing Coop with a shotgun, the two shots which eventually kills Coop and a final conversation between the two cops over the radio. The last scene shows the old Jimmy walking into a familiar lot with a young Coop waiting beside a police car, the past and present juxtaposed. The camera then cuts to Coop and a young Jimmy who holds his partner's hand, and the two are then shown in colour against a black & white background and they slowly fade away.

Nick Vera has a side storyline in this episode providing comic relief. It involves a single black mother, nurse Toni Jameson, and her son Andre Halstead. Vera steals Andre's basketball as the teenager annoys Vera by playing with his basketball at the most inopportune moments, right outside his window. Jameson personally goes down to Vera's department to demand the ball back and they end up quarreling. Jameson fails to retrieve the ball and leaves angrily, asking Vera to "grow up". Later, Vera arrives in front of Jameson's doorstep with a new basketball and apologizes to her. Jameson then gets Andre to receive the basketball personally and ends up apologizing back to Vera instead for her son's rudeness and sarcasm. The two patch up moments later. At the final sequence which sums up the episode, the two of them are seen carrying groceries back to their apartment together with a surprised Andre appearing before them, making Vera very awkward.

Reception
First aired on December 3, 2006, the episode was first praised by the AfterElton.com blog The Best Gay Day Ever for its gay sensibilities (see below). According to a Shane Johnson interview done by the same site, this particular episode was also highly praised by the cast itself. As he shares, "even the regular cast on the show commented on how great they felt the episode was."

The gay-themed website Good As You said they had never received more e-mails and instant messages than they did in response to the episode.

"Forever Blue" is regarded as a major milestone by fans. It is the first time a dramatic gay romance with a passionate on-screen kiss is shown on free public accessed television.

There were many similarities to Brokeback Mountain.

References

External links
 Interview with Shane Johnson on "Forever Blue" from AfterElton.com
 Lyrics to Bob Dylan's "My Back Pages" from BobDylan.com
 Shane Johnson's personal site
 Brian Hallisay fan site

2006 American television episodes
Cold Case episodes
Television episodes set in Philadelphia
American LGBT-related television episodes